Ventsy is a rural locality (a khutor) in Verkhnebuzinovskoye Rural Settlement, Kletsky District, Volgograd Oblast, Russia. The population was 119 as of 2010.

Geography 
Ventsy is located in steppe on the left bank of the Ventsy River, 31 km southeast of Kletskaya (the district's administrative centre) by road. Verkhnyaya Buzinovka is the nearest rural locality.

References 

Rural localities in Kletsky District